Ewan Dowes (born 4 March 1981) is an English former professional rugby league footballer who played for the Leeds Rhinos (Heritage № 1324) and Hull F.C. in the Super League. He was a member of the Hull team that won the 2005 Challenge Cup. Dowes was sport's first owner of a dual rugby code contract.

Career
He attended Sedbergh School, Sedbergh near Kendal where he played on both the 1st XV and 1st XI. In his final year at Sedbergh he trained and played alongside James Simpson-Daniel. A review of his performance in the school magazine states: "Ewan Dowes was well to the fore in all departments, carrying the ball powerfully, scrummaging purposefully."

Dowes signed for Hull in 2003. He was released after his contract expired at the end of the 2011 Super League season.

He has played for the Leeds Rhinos, and also had a contract with the rugby union side Leeds Tykes.

He has played representative football for England.

References

External links
(archived by archive.is) Profile at leeds Rhinos
Profile at therhinos.co.uk
Hull F.C.ĎŔƑ

1981 births
Living people
Dewsbury Rams players
England national rugby league team players
English rugby league players
English rugby union players
Hull F.C. players
Leeds Rhinos players
Leeds Tykes players
People educated at Sedbergh School
Rugby league players from Carlisle
Rugby league props
Rugby union players from Carlisle, Cumbria
Workington Town players